Šamši-Adad IV, inscribed mdšam-ši-dIM, was the king of Assyria, 1054/3–1050 BC, the 91st to be listed on the Assyrian Kinglist. He was a son of Tukultī-apil-Ešarra I (1114–1076 BC), the third to have taken the throne, after his brothers Ašarēd-apil-Ekur and Ashur-bel-kala, and he usurped the kingship from the latter’s son, the short-reigning Erība-Adad II (1055–1054 BC). It is quite probable that he was fairly elderly when he seized the throne.

Biography

The Assyrian kinglist recalls that he “came up from Karduniaš (i.e. Babylonia). He ousted Erība-Adad, son of Aššur-bêl-kala, seized the throne and ruled for 4 years.” The king of Babylon was Adad-apla-iddina, who had been installed more than a decade earlier by Šamši-Adad’s brother, Ashur-bel-kala. The extent to which he was instrumental in the succession is uncertain but it seems that Šamši-Adad may have earlier sought refuge in exile in the south.

The Synchronistic Kinglist gives Ea-, presumed to be Ea-mukin-zēri (c. 1008 BC), as his Babylonian contemporary, an unlikely pairing as he was likely to have been concurrent with the latter kings of the 2nd dynasty of Isin during its dying throes. The political events of his reign are obscure and his fragmentary inscriptions are limited to commemorating renovation work carried out on the Ištar temple at Nineveh and the bīt nāmeru, “gate-tower,” at Aššur.

He would be succeeded by his son, Aššur-naṣir-apli I.

Inscriptions

References

11th-century BC Assyrian kings
1050s BC deaths
Year of birth unknown